Aketi may refer to:

People
Oluwarotimi Odunayo Akeredolu

Places
Aketi Airport
Aketi (town), Democratic Republic of the Congo
Aketi Territory
 A community in Guria region, Georgia.

Other
Aketi River